The Royal Oldham Hospital is a NHS hospital in the Coldhurst area of Oldham, Greater Manchester, England. It is managed by the Northern Care Alliance NHS Foundation Trust. The hospital has its own volunteer-run radio station, Radio Cavell, which broadcasts at 1350 AM.

History
The hospital has its origins in the workhouse infirmary established to support the Oldham Union Workhouse on the Rochdale Road in around 1870. It became the Boundary Park Hospital in the late 1920s and, after joining the National Health Service in 1948, it became Oldham and District General Hospital in 1955.

The hospital was the birthplace of English physicist Brian Cox, who is a professor of particle physics in the School of Physics and Astronomy at the University of Manchester; he was born in 1968.
 The hospital was also the birthplace of Louise Brown, the world's first successful in vitro fertilised "test tube baby", on 25 July 1978. 

In April 2018 the hospital joined the National Bereavement Care Pathway, which intends to ensure a common standard in bereavement care for parents.

Radio Cavell
Radio Cavell, founded in 1952, provides a hospital radio service in the hospital.

See also
Westhulme Hospital
 List of hospitals in England

References

External links
Official site

Buildings and structures in Oldham
NHS hospitals in England
Hospitals in Greater Manchester
Municipal hospitals
Poor law infirmaries